16 Biggest Hits is a compilation album from the country music band Diamond Rio. It was released on February 23, 2008 by Arista Nashville after the group left the label.

Track listing

Chart performance
16 Biggest Hits peaked at #63 on the U.S. Billboard Top Country Albums chart the week of August 25, 2007.

Personnel 

 Gene Johnson – mandolin, tenor vocals
 Jimmy Olander – acoustic guitar, electric guitar, banjo
 Brian Prout – drums
 Marty Roe – lead vocals, acoustic guitar
 Dan Truman – keyboards, piano, organ
 Dana Williams – bass guitar, baritone vocals

References

 Diamond Rio's 16 Biggest Hits album at CMT.com ( 2009-05-08)

Diamond Rio compilation albums
Diamond Rio
2008 greatest hits albums
Arista Records compilation albums